In mammals, the Bötzinger complex (BötC) is a group of neurons located in the rostral ventrolateral medulla, and ventral respiratory column. In the medulla, this group is located caudally to the facial nucleus and ventral to nucleus ambiguus.

Function
The Bötzinger complex plays an important role in controlling breathing and responding to hypoxia. The Bötzinger complex consists primarily of glycinergic neurons which inhibit respiratory activity. Of the respiratory cycle phases BötC generates post-inspiratory (Post-I) activity and augmenting expiratory (aug-e) activity.

Name
The Bötzinger complex was named by UCLA Professor Jack Feldman in 1978, after a bottle of white wine named Botzinger present at his table during a scientific meeting in Hirschhorn, Germany, that year.

Connections
The Bötzinger  Complex has projections to
 Phrenic pre-motor neurons in the medulla
 Phrenic motor neurons in the cervical spinal cord
 The dorsal respiratory group (DRG)  
 Ventral respiratory group (VRG)
 Pre-Bötzinger complex
 Bötzinger  complex 
 Parabrachial Kolliker-Fuse nucleus
Only augmenting expiratory neurons of BötC, which are exclusively glycinergic, project to the phrenic nucleus.

Projections to the Bötzinger complex include the nucleus tractus solitarii (NTS) the DRG and the VRG.

Physiology
These neurons are intrinsic pacemakers. Post-I neurons display an initial burst of activity followed by decrease in activity at the end of inspiration. Aug-E neurons begin firing during the E2 phase and end before the phrenic nerve burst.

References

Brainstem
Neuroanatomy
Respiration